The Purépecha are an indigenous people of the Mexican state of Michoacán.

Purépecha may also refer to:
 Purépecha language, the language of the Purépecha
 Purépecha religion, the traditional religion of the Purépecha
 Purépecha Empire, or the Tarascan state, an indigenous civilization in Mexico centered on the Purépecha